Ako ay Pilipino is a Filipino patriotic song written by George Canseco in 1981, commissioned by First Lady Imelda Marcos for the inauguration of her husband, 10th President Ferdinand E. Marcos, and performed by Kuh Ledesma.

On February 8, 2022 Toni Gonzaga performed the song but in a shorter version in singing its final stanza at the end of Uniteam's proclamation rally for Bongbong Marcos (Marcos, Sr. and Imelda's son) and Sara Duterte's campaign for president and vice-president held at the Philippine Arena.

References

Tagalog-language songs
Filipino patriotic songs
Philippine pop songs
1981 songs